Jean-Luc Poudroux (born 29 August 1950) is a French politician who was elected Member of Parliament for Réunion's 7th constituency in the 2018 by-election.

He stood down at the 2022 French legislative election.

References 

Living people
1950 births
Deputies of the 15th National Assembly of the French Fifth Republic
21st-century French politicians
Mayors of places in Réunion
Members of Parliament for Réunion

See also 

 List of deputies of the 16th National Assembly of France